The 2007 Boston Red Sox season was the 107th season in the franchise's Major League Baseball history. Managed by Terry Francona, the Red Sox finished first in the American League East with a record of 96 wins and 66 losses.  In the postseason, the Red Sox first swept the American League West champion Los Angeles Angels of Anaheim in the ALDS.  In the ALCS, the Red Sox defeated the American League Central champion Cleveland Indians in seven games, despite falling behind 3–1 in the series. Advancing to the World Series, the Red Sox swept the National League champion Colorado Rockies, to capture their second championship in four years.

Off-season

On November 14, 2006, Major League Baseball announced that the Red Sox had competed for the rights to negotiate a contract with Japanese pitcher Daisuke Matsuzaka.  Boston won with a bid of US$51.1 million and had 30 days to complete a deal. On December 13, 2006, the day before the deadline, Matsuzaka signed a six-year contract worth $52 million.

It was initially announced that closer Jonathan Papelbon would become a starter in 2007, partially to protect his arm from the injury that sidelined him. Pitchers Hideki Okajima, J. C. Romero and Joel Piñeiro were signed as free agents. Brendan Donnelly was acquired from the Los Angeles Angels in a trade for pitcher Phil Seibel.

However, there was no clear candidate for the closer role.  Papelbon wanted to re-fill that spot, and team officials believed he had rehabilitated himself so well in the offseason that his health of this shoulder was no longer a concern, and allowed him to return to the bullpen.

The Red Sox lost free agent Álex González to the Cincinnati Reds (leading the Red Sox to sign Julio Lugo) and Mark Loretta to the Houston Astros (allowing Dustin Pedroia to become the team's starting second baseman). Trot Nixon, also a free agent, signed with the Cleveland Indians, creating the need for a right fielder.  The Red Sox pursued J. D. Drew, who had recently opted out of the remainder of his contract with the Los Angeles Dodgers to become a free agent. However, the Red Sox medical staff had concerns about Drew's previously injured shoulder. On January 25, 2007, the Red Sox and Drew agreed to a five-year deal worth $70 million.

Outfielder Gabe Kapler, age 31, announced his retirement to fulfill his lifelong dream of becoming a coach.  The Red Sox named him manager of their single-A affiliate, the Greenville Drive.

At the end of spring training of 2007, the Red Sox traded minor league veteran catcher Alberto Castillo for Baltimore Orioles outfielder Cory Keylor.

Regular season

Opening Day lineup

Honoring a Boston legend
Bright green jerseys, with "Red Sox" in white letters outlined in red across the front, were worn on April 20 to honor former Boston Celtics coach, general manager, and president Red Auerbach, who had died during the previous off-season. The jerseys also had players' names on the back, believed to be a first for Red Sox home uniforms.

Season standings

Record vs. opponents

Notable transactions
November 30, 2006: Hideki Okajima signed as a free agent with the Red Sox.
December 6, 2006: Julio Lugo signed as a free agent with the Red Sox.
December 14, 2006: Daisuke Matsuzaka was purchased by the Red Sox from Seibu Lions.
December 15, 2006: J. C. Romero signed as a free agent with the Red Sox.
January 4, 2007: Joel Piñeiro signed as a free agent with the Red Sox.
February 14, 2007: J. D. Drew signed as a free agent with the Red Sox.
June 18, 2007: J. C. Romero was released by the Red Sox.
July 31, 2007: Éric Gagné was acquired by the Red Sox from the Rangers in exchange for Engel Beltré, Kason Gabbard and David Murphy. In a separate trade, minor leaguer Sean Danielson was acquired by the Red Sox from the Cardinals in exchange for Joel Piñeiro.
August 6, 2007: Bobby Kielty signed as a free agent with the Red Sox.
August 21, 2007: Minor leaguer Chris Carter was acquired by the Red Sox from the Nationals. Four days earlier, the Red Sox traded outfielder Wily Mo Peña to the Nationals.
August 23, 2007: Royce Clayton signed as a free agent with the Red Sox.

Game log

|- style="background-color:#ffbbbb"
| 1 || April 2 || @ Royals || 7 – 1 || Meche (1-0)|| Schilling (0-1) || || 41,257 || 0-1
|- style="background-color:#bbffbb"
| 2 || April 4 || @ Royals || 7 – 1 || Beckett (1-0) || Pérez (0 – 1) || || 22,348 || 1-1
|- style="background-color:#bbffbb"
| 3 || April 5 || @ Royals || 4 – 1 || Matsuzaka (1-0) || Greinke (0-1) || Papelbon (1) || 23,170 || 2-1
|- style="background-color:#ffbbbb"
| 4 || April 6 || @ Rangers || 2 – 0 || Tejeda (1-0) || Wakefield (0-1) || Otsuka (1) || 51,548 || 2-2
|- style="background-color:#ffbbbb"
| 5 || April 7 || @ Rangers || 8 – 2 || Millwood (1-0) || Tavárez (0-1) || ||40,865 || 2-3
|- style="background-color:#bbffbb"
| 6 || April 8 || @ Rangers || 3 – 2 || Schilling (1-1) || Padilla (0-2) || Papelbon (2) || 28,347 || 3-3
|- style="background-color:#bbffbb"
| 7 || April 10 || Mariners || 14 – 3 || Beckett (2-0) || Weaver (0-1) || || 35,847 || 4-3
|- style="background-color:#ffbbbb"
| 8 || April 11 || Mariners || 3 – 0 || Hernández (2-0) || Matsuzaka (1-1) || || 36,630 || 4-4
|- style="background-color:#bbbbbb"
| -- || April 12 || Mariners || colspan=5|Postponed (rain)  || 4-4
|- style="background-color:#bbffbb"
| 9 || April 13 || Angels || 10 – 1 || Wakefield (1-1) || Lackey (2-1) || || 35,946 || 5-4
|- style="background-color:#bbffbb"
| 10 || April 14 || Angels || 8 – 0 || Schilling (2-1) || Carrasco (0-1) || || 36,300 || 6-4
|- style="background-color:#bbbbbb"
| -- || April 15 || Angels || colspan=5|Postponed (rain)  || 6-4
|- style="background-color:#bbffbb"
| 11 || April 16 || Angels || 7 – 2 || Beckett (3-0) || Santana (1-2) || || 35,424 || 7-4
|- style="background-color:#ffbbbb"
| 12 || April 17 || @ Blue Jays || 2 – 1 || Chacín (2-0) || Matsuzaka (1-2) || Frasor (1) || 42,162 || 7-5
|- style="background-color:#bbffbb"
| 13 || April 18 || @ Blue Jays || 4 – 1 || Wakefield (2-1) || Ohka (0-2) || Papelbon (3) || 20,188 || 8-5
|- style="background-color:#bbffbb"
| 14 || April 19 || @ Blue Jays || 5 – 3 || Timlin (1-0) || Marcum (1-1) || Papelbon (4) || 33,297 || 9-5
|- style="background-color:#bbffbb"
| 15 || April 20 || Yankees || 7 – 6 || Snyder (1-0) || Rivera (1-2) || Okajima (1) || 36,786 || 10-5
|- style="background-color:#bbffbb"
| 16 || April 21 || Yankees || 7 – 5 || Beckett (4-0) || Karstens (0-1) || Papelbon (5) || 36,342 || 11-5
|- style="background-color:#bbffbb"
| 17 || April 22 || Yankees || 7 – 6 || Matsuzaka (2-2) || Proctor (0-1) || Papelbon (6) || 36,905 || 12-5
|- style="background-color:#ffbbbb"
| 18 || April 23 || Blue Jays || 7 – 3 || Ohka (1-2) || Wakefield (2-2) || Frasor (2) || 36,669 || 12-6
|- style="background-color:#ffbbbb"
| 19 || April 24 || Blue Jays || 10 – 3 || Halladay (3-0) || Tavárez (0-2) || || 37,161 || 12-7
|- style="background-color:#bbffbb"
| 20 || April 25 || @ Orioles || 6 – 1 || Schilling (3-1) || Cabrera (1-2) || || 27,613 || 13-7
|- style="background-color:#bbffbb"
| 21 || April 26 || @ Orioles || 5 – 2 || Beckett (5-0) || Ray (2-2) || Papelbon (7) || 33,522 || 14-7
|- style="background-color:#bbffbb"
| 22 || April 27 || @ Yankees || 11 – 4 || Matsuzaka (3-2) || Pettitte (1-1) || || 55,005 || 15-7
|- style="background-color:#ffbbbb"
| 23 || April 28 || @ Yankees || 3 – 1 || Igawa (2-1)  || Wakefield (2-3) || Rivera (1) || 55,026 || 15-8
|- style="background-color:#bbffbb"
| 24 || April 29 || @ Yankees || 7 – 4 || Tavárez (1-2) || Wang (0-2) || Papelbon (8) || 54,856 || 16-8

|- style="background-color:#ffbbbb"
| 25 || May 1 || Athletics || 5 – 4  || Duchscherer (2-1) || Donnelly (0-1) || Street (7) || 37,052 || 16-9
|- style="background-color:#bbffbb"
| 26 || May 2 || Athletics || 6 – 4 || Beckett (6-0) || Marshall (1-1) || Timlin (1) || 37,006 || 17-9
|- style="background-color:#bbffbb"
| 27 || May 3 || Mariners || 8 – 7 || Donnelly(1-1) || Reitsma (0-1) || Romero (1) || 37,216 || 18-9
|- style="background-color:#bbffbb"
| 28 || May 4 || @ Twins || 2 – 0 || Wakefield (3-3) || Silva (2-2) || Papelbon (9) || 34,951 || 19-9
|- style="background-color:#ffbbbb"
| 29 || May 5 || @ Twins || 2 – 1 || Santana (4-2) || Tavárez (1-3) || Nathan (8) || 40,088 || 19-10
|- style="background-color:#bbffbb"
| 30 || May 6 || @ Twins || 4 – 3 || Schilling (4-1) || Ponson (2-4) || Papelbon (10) || 27,807 || 20-10
|- style="background-color:#bbffbb"
| 31 || May 8 || @ Blue Jays || 9 – 2 || Beckett (7-0) || Zambrano (0-2) || || 41,203 || 21-10
|- style="background-color:#bbffbb"
| 32 || May 9 || @ Blue Jays || 9 – 3 || Matsuzaka (4-2) || Ohka (2-4-) || || 21,784 || 22-10
|- style="background-color:#bbffbb"
| 33 || May 10 || @ Blue Jays || 8 – 0 || Wakefield (4-3) || Halladay (4-2) || || 22,290 || 23-10
|- style="background-color:#ffbbbb"
| 34 || May 11 || Orioles || 6 – 3 || Burres (1-1) || Tavárez (1-4) || Ray (8) || 37,039 || 23-11
|- style="background-color:#bbffbb"
| 35 || May 12 || Orioles || 13 – 4 || López (1-0) || Leicester (0-1) || || 36,503 || 24-11
|- style="background-color:#bbffbb"
| 36 || May 13 || Orioles || 6 – 5 || Romero  (1-0) || Ray (3-3) || || 36,379 || 25-11
|- style="background-color:#bbffbb"
| 37 || May 14 || Tigers || 7 – 1 || Matsuzaka (5-2) || Robertson (3-3) || || 36,935 || 26-11
|- style="background-color:#ffbbbb"
| 38 || May 15 || Tigers || 7 – 2 || Verlander (3-1) || Wakefield (4-4) || || 37,031 || 26-12
|- style="background-color:#bbbbbb"
| -- || May 16 || Tigers || colspan=5|Postponed (rain)  || 26-12
|- style="background-color:#bbffbb"
| 39 || May 17 || Tigers || 2 – 1 || Tavárez (2-4) || Miner (0-1)|| Papelbon (11) || 36,767 || 27-12
|- style="background-color:#bbffbb"
| 40 || May 17 || Tigers || 4 – 2 ||Donnelly (2-1) || Ledezma (0-1)|| Okajima (2) || 37,006 || 28-12
|- style="background-color:#bbbbbb"
| -- || May 18 || Braves || colspan=5|Postponed (rain)  || 28-12
|- style="background-color:#bbffbb"
| 41 || May 19 || Braves || 13 – 3 || Matsuzaka (6-2) || Lerew (0-2) || || 36,358 || 29-12
|- style="background-color:#ffbbbb"
| 42 || May 19 || Braves || 14 – 0 || Smoltz (6-2) || Hansack (0-1) || || 36,792 || 29-13
|- style="background-color:#bbffbb"
| 43 || May 20 || Braves || 6 – 3 || Gabbard (1-0) || Hudson (5-2) || || 36,140 || 30-13
|- style="background-color:#ffbbbb"
| 44 || May 21 || @ Yankees || 6 – 2 || Wang (3-3) || Wakefield (4-5) || || 55,078 || 30-14
|- style="background-color:#bbffbb"
| 45 || May 22 || @ Yankees || 7 – 3 || Tavárez (3-4) || Mussina || || 54,739 || 31-14
|- style="background-color:#ffbbbb"
| 46 || May 23 || @ Yankees || 8 – 3 || Pettitte' (3-3) || Schilling (4-2) || || 55,000 || 31-15
|- style="background-color:#bbffbb"
| 47 || May 25 || @ Rangers || 10 – 6 || Matsuzaka (7-2) || Littleton (0-1) || || 33,552 || 32-15
|- style="background-color:#bbffbb"
| 48 || May 26 || @ Rangers || 7 – 4 || Wakefield (5-5) || Padilla (2-7) || Papelbon (12) || 37,974 || 33-15
|- style="background-color:#bbffbb"
| 49 || May 27 || @ Rangers || 6 – 5 || Piñeiro (1-0) || Otsuka (1-1) || Okajima (3) || 40,323 || 34-15
|- style="background-color:#bbffbb"
| 50 || May 28 || Indians || 5 – 3 || Schilling (5-2) || Lee (2-2) || Papelbon (13) || 36,910 || 35-15
|- style="background-color:#bbffbb"
| 51 || May 29 || Indians || 4 – 2 || Beckett (8-0) || Sowers (1-5) || Okajima (4) || 37,076 || 36-15
|- style="background-color:#ffbbbb"
| 52 || May 30 || Indians || 8 – 4 || Byrd (6-1) || Matsuzaka (7-3) || || 37,091 || 36-16

|- style="background-color:#ffbbbb"
| 53 || June 1 || Yankees || 9 – 5 || Wang (4-4) || Wakefield (5-6) || || 36,785 || 36-17
|- style="background-color:#bbffbb"
| 54 || June 2 || Yankees || 11 – 6 || Okajima (1-0) || Proctor (0-3) || || 36,294 || 37-17
|- style="background-color:#ffbbbb"
| 55 || June 3 || Yankees || |6 – 5 || Bruney (2-1) || Papelbon (0-1) || Rivera (5) || 36,793 || 37-18
|- style="background-color:#ffbbbb"
| 56 || June 4 || @ Athletics || 5 – 4  || Casilla (1-0) || Snyder (1-1) || || 28,177 || 37-19
|- style="background-color:#ffbbbb"
| 57 || June 5 || @ Athletics || 2 – 0 || DiNardo (2-2) || Matsuzaka (7-4) || Embree (5) || 31,127 || 37-20
|- style="background-color:#ffbbbb"
| 58 || June 6 || @ Athletics || 3 – 2 || Kennedy (2-4) || Wakefield (5-7) || Casilla (1) || 32,280 || 37-21
|- style="background-color:#bbffbb"
| 59 || June 7 || @ Athletics || 1 – 0 || Schilling (6-2) || Blanton (5-4) || || 31,211 || 38-21
|- style="background-color:#bbffbb"
| 60 || June 8 || @ D-backs || 10 – 3 || Beckett (9-0) || Davis (4-7) || || 40,435 || 39-21
|- style="background-color:#bbffbb"
| 61 || June 9 || @ D-backs || 4 – 3  || Okajima (2-0) || Cruz (2-1) || Papelbon (14) || 49,826 || 40-21
|- style="background-color:#ffbbbb"
| 62 || June 10 || @ D-backs || 5 – 1 || Johnson (4-2) || Matsuzaka (7-5) || || 46,622 || 40-22
|- style="background-color:#bbffbb"
| 63 || June 12 || Rockies || 2 – 1 || Wakefield (6-7) || Cook (4-3) || Papelbon (15) || 37,008 || 41-22
|- style="background-color:#ffbbbb"
| 64 || June 13 || Rockies || 12 – 2 || Fogg (2-5) || Schilling (6-3) || || 36,808 || 41-23
|- style="background-color:#ffbbbb"
| 65 || June 14 || Rockies || 7 – 1 || Francis (6-5) || Beckett (9-1) || || 36,936 || 41-24
|- style="background-color:#bbffbb"
| 66 || June 15 || Giants || 10 – 2 || Tavárez (4-4) || Zito (6-7) || || 36,508 || 42-24
|- style="background-color:#bbffbb"
| 67 || June 16 || Giants || 1 – 0 || Matsuzaka (8-5) || Cain (2-7) || Papelbon (16) || 36,381 || 43-24
|- style="background-color:#bbffbb"
| 68 || June 17 || Giants || 9 – 5 || Wakefield (7-7) || Morris (7-4) || || 36,137 || 44-24
|- style="background-color:#ffbbbb"
| 69 || June 18 || @ Braves || 9 – 4 || James (6-6) || Schilling (6-4) || || 47,562 || 44-25
|- style="background-color:#bbffbb"
| 70 || June 19 || @ Braves || 4 – 0 || Beckett (10-1) || Hudson (6-5) || || 47,910 || 45-25
|- style="background-color:#bbffbb"
| 71 || June 20 || @ Braves || 11 – 0 || Tavárez (5-4) || Carlyle (1-2) || || 49,585 || 46-25
|- style="background-color:#bbffbb"
| 72 || June 22 || @ Padres || 2 – 1 || Matsuzaka (9-5) || Maddux (6-4) || Papelbon (17) || 44,405 || 47-25
|- style="background-color:#ffbbbb"
| 73 || June 23 || @ Padres || 6 – 1 || Young (7-3) || Wakefield (7-8) || || 44,457 || 47-26
|- style="background-color:#bbffbb"
| 74 || June 24 || @ Padres || 4 – 2 || Beckett (11-1) || Peavy (9-2) || Papelbon (18) || 44,449 || 48-26
|- style="background-color:#ffbbbb"
| 75 || June 25 || @ Mariners || 9 – 5 || Weaver (2-6) || Tavárez (5-5) || || 33,830 || 48-27
|- style="background-color:#ffbbbb"
| 76 || June 26 || @ Mariners || 8 – 7 || O'Flaherty (5-0) || Lopez (1-1) || Putz (22) || 35,045 || 48-28
|- style="background-color:#ffbbbb"
| 77 || June 27 || @ Mariners || 2 – 1  || Davis (2-0)|| Piñeiro (1-1) || || 43,448 || 48-29
|- style="background-color:#bbffbb"
| 78 || June 29 || Rangers || 2 – 1 || Wakefield (8-8) || Wright (1-2) || Papelbon (19) || 36,756 || 49-29
|- style="background-color:#ffbbbb"
| 79 || June 30 || Rangers || 5 – 4 || Mahay (1-0) || Beckett (11-2) || Gagné (9) || 36,747 || 49-31

|- style="background-color:#ffbbbb"
| 80 || July 1 || Rangers || 2 – 1 || Loe (5-6) || Tavárez (5-6) || Gagné (10) || 36,378 || 49-31
|- style="background-color:#bbffbb"
| 81 || July 2 || Rangers || 7 – 3 || Gabbard (2-0) || McCarthy (4-5) || || 36,778 || 50-31
|- style="background-color:#bbffbb"
| 82 || July 3 || Devil Rays || 4 – 1 || Matsuzaka (10-5) || Kazmir (5-5) || || 37,005 || 51-31
|- style="background-color:#bbffbb"
| 83 || July 4 || Devil Rays || 7 – 5 || Wakefield (9-8) || Jackson (1-9) || Papelbon (20) || 36,629 || 52-31
|- style="background-color:#bbffbb"
| 84 || July 5 || Devil Rays || 15 – 4 || Beckett (12-2) || Howell (1-3) || || 37,044 || 53-31
|- style="background-color:#ffbbbb"
| 85 || July 6 || @ Tigers || 9 – 2 || Miller (4-2) || Tavárez (5-7) || || 43,839 || 53-32
|- style="background-color:#ffbbbb"
| 86 || July 7 || @ Tigers || 3 – 2  || Grilli (3-2) || Papelbon (0-2) || || 44,193 || 53-33
|- style="background-color:#ffbbbb"
| 87 || July 8 || @ Tigers || 6 – 5 || Robertson (5-6) || Matsuzaka (10-6) || Jones (22) || 41,943 || 53-34
|- style="background-color:#bbffbb"
| 88 || July 12 || Blue Jays || 7 – 4 || Wakefield (10-8) || Halladay (10-4) || Papelbon (21) || 36,887 || 54-34
|- style="background-color:#ffbbbb"
| 89 || July 13 || Blue Jays || 6 – 5 || Marcum (5-3) || Snyder (1-2) || Accardo (12) || 36,908 || 54-35
|- style="background-color:#bbffbb"
| 90 || July 14 || Blue Jays || 9 – 4 || Matsuzaka (11-6) || McGowan (5-5) || || 36,830 || 55-35
|- style="background-color:#ffbbbb"
| 91 || July 15 || Blue Jays || 2 – 1 || Litsch (2-3) || Beckett (12-3) || Accardo (13) || 36,301 || 55-36
|- style="background-color:#bbffbb"
| 92 || July 16 || Royals || 4 – 0 || Gabbard (3-0) || Bannister (5-6) || || 37,099 || 56-36
|- style="background-color:#ffbbbb"
| 93 || July 17 || Royals || 9 – 3 || Gobble (4-1) || Wakefield (10-9) || || 37,001 || 56-37
|- style="background-color:#ffbbbb"
| 94 || July 18 || Royals || 6 – 5 || Pérez (5-8) || Tavárez (5-8) || Dotel (10) || 36,681 || 56-38
|- style="background-color:#ffbbbb"
| 95 || July 19 || White Sox || 4 – 2 || Vázquez (7-5) || Matsuzaka (11-7) || Jenks (26) || 36,913 || 56-39
|- style="background-color:#bbffbb"
| 96 || July 20 || White Sox || 10 – 3 || Beckett (13-3) || Contreras (5-12) || || 36,737 || 57-39
|- style="background-color:#bbffbb"
| 97 || July 21 || White Sox || 11 – 2 || Gabbard (4-0) || Danks (6-7) || || 36,283 || 58-39
|- style="background-color:#bbffbb"
| 98 || July 22 || White Sox || 8 – 5 || Wakefield (11-9) || Garland (7-7) || Papelbon (22) || 36,346 || 59-39
|- style="background-color:#bbffbb"
| 99 || July 23 || @ Indians || 6 – 2 || Lester (1-0) || Westbrook (1-6) || Delcarmen (1) || 32,439 || 60-39
|- style="background-color:#bbffbb"
| 100 || July 24 || @ Indians || 1 – 0 || Matsuzaka (12-7) || Sabathia (13-5) || Papelbon (23) || 39,339 || 61-39
|- style="background-color:#ffbbbb"
| 101 || July 25 || @ Indians || 1 – 0 || Carmona (13-4)
|| Beckett (13-4) || Borowski (29) || 29,614 || 61-40
|- style="background-color:#bbffbb"
| 102 || July 26 || @ Indians || 14 – 9 || Tavárez (6-8) || Lee (5-8) || || 34,286 || 62-40
|- style="background-color:#bbffbb"
| 103 || July 27 || @ Devil Rays || 7 – 1 || Wakefield (12-9) || Hammel (1-1)  || || 33,144 || 63-40
|- style="background-color:#bbffbb"
| 104 || July 28 || @ Devil Rays || 12 – 6  || Snyder (2-2) || Stokes (2-7) || || 36,048 || 64-40
|- style="background-color:#ffbbbb"
| 105 || July 29 || @ Devil Rays || 5 – 2 || Glover (4-3) || Matsuzaka (12-8) || || 34,813 || 64-41
|- style="background-color:#ffbbbb"
| 106 || July 31 || Orioles || 5 – 3 || Bédard (11-4) || Beckett (13-5) || Walker (4) || 36,866 || 64-42

|- style="background-color:#bbffbb"
| 107 || August 1 || Orioles ||5-4 ||López (2-1) ||Parrish (2-2) ||Papelbon (24)||36,649||65-42
|- style="background-color:#bbffbb"
| 108 || August 2 || Orioles ||7-4 ||Wakefield (13-9) ||Bell (3-2) || ||36,457||66-42
|- style="background-color:#ffbbbb"
| 109 || August 3 || @ Mariners || 7 – 4 || Green (5-1) || Timlin (1-1) || Putz (32) || 46,235 || 66-43
|- style="background-color:#bbffbb"
| 110 || August 4 || @ Mariners || 4 – 3 || Matsuzaka (13-8) || Washburn (8-8) || Papelbon (25) || 46,313 || 67-43
|- style="background-color:#bbffbb"
| 111 || August 5 || @ Mariners || 9 – 2 || Beckett (14-5) || Batista (11-8) ||  || 46,377 || 68-43
|- style="background-color:#ffbbbb"
| 112 || August 6 || @ Angels || 4 – 2 || Speier (1-2) || Schilling (6-5) || Rodríguez (28) || 44,142 || 68-44
|- style="background-color:#ffbbbb"
| 113 || August 7 || @ Angels || 10 – 4 || Saunders (6-0) || Wakefield (13-10) || || 44,177 || 68-45
|- style="background-color:#bbffbb"
| 114 || August 8 || @ Angels || 9 – 6 || Okajima (3-0) || Speier (1-3) || Papelbon (26) || 44,243 || 69-45
|- style="background-color:#ffbbbb"
| 115 || August 10 || @ Orioles || 6 – 5 || Hoey (1-0) || Okajima (3-1) || || 48,993 || 69-46
|- style="background-color:#bbffbb"
| 116 || August 11 || @ Orioles || 6 – 2 || Beckett (15-5) || Olson (1-1) || Papelbon (27) || 49,242 || 70-46
|- style="background-color:#ffbbbb"
| 117 || August 12 || @ Orioles || 6 – 3  || Bradford (1-4) || Snyder (2-3) || || 48,551 || 70-47
|- style="background-color:#bbffbb"
| 118 || August 13 || Devil Rays || 3 – 0 || Wakefield (14-10) || Shields (9-8) || Papelbon (28) || 36,808 || 71-47
|- style="background-color:#bbffbb"
| 119 || August 14 || Devil Rays || 2 – 1 || Gagné (3-0) || Reyes (1-2) || || 36,837 || 72-47
|- style="background-color:#ffbbbb"
| 120 || August 15 || Devil Rays || 6 – 5 || Sonnanstine (2-8) || Matsuzaka (13-9) || Reyes (18) || 36,413 || 72-48
|- style="background-color:#bbffbb"
| 121 || August 17 || Angels || 8 – 4 || Buchholz (1-0) || Lackey (15-7) || Papelbon (29) || 36,686 || 73-48
|- style="background-color:#ffbbbb"
| 122 || August 17 || Angels || 7 – 5 || Rodríguez (5-2) || Gagné (3-1) || || 36,538 || 73-49
|- style="background-color:#bbffbb"
| 123 || August 18 || Angels || 10 – 5 || Schilling (7-5) || Jer Weaver (8-6) || || 36,652 || 74-49
|- style="background-color:#ffbbbb"
| 124 || August 19 || Angels || 3 – 1 || Saunders (7-1) || Tavárez (6-9) || Rodríguez (31) || 36,346 || 74-50
|- style="background-color:#bbffbb"
| 125 || August 20 || @ Devil Rays || 6 – 0 || Wakefield (15-10) || Kazmir (9-8) || || 16,843 || 75-50
|- style="background-color:#bbffbb"
| 126 || August 21 || @ Devil Rays || 8 – 6 || Lester (2-0) || Sonnanstine (2-9) || Papelbon (30) || 16,393 || 76-50
|- style="background-color:#ffbbbb"
| 127 || August 22 || @ Devil Rays || 2 – 1 || Jackson (4-12) || Matsuzaka (13-10) || Reyes (19) || 17,839 || 76-51
|- style="background-color:#bbbbbb"
| -- || August 23 || @ White Sox || colspan=5|Postponed (rain)  || 76-51
|- style="background-color:#bbffbb"
| 128 || August 24 || @ White Sox || 11 – 3 || Beckett (16-5) || Garland (8-10) || || 30,581 || 77-51
|- style="background-color:#bbffbb"
| 129 || August 24 || @ White Sox || 10 – 1 || Schilling (8-5) || Danks (6-12) || || 37,639 || 78-51
|- style="background-color:#bbffbb"
| 130 || August 25 || @ White Sox || 14 – 2 || Wakefield (16-10) || Buehrle (9-9) || || 38,874 || 79-51
|- style="background-color:#bbffbb"
| 131 || August 26 || @ White Sox || 11 – 1 || Tavárez (7-9) || Vázquez (11-7) || || 36,745 || 80-51
|- style="background-color:#ffbbbb"
| 132 || August 28 || @ Yankees || 5 – 3 || Pettitte (12-7) || Matsuzaka (13-11) || Rivera (21) || 55,037 || 80-52
|- style="background-color:#ffbbbb"
| 133 || August 29 || @ Yankees || 4 – 3 || Clemens (6-5) || Beckett (16-6) || Rivera (22) || 54,986 || 80-53
|- style="background-color:#ffbbbb"
| 134 || August 30 || @ Yankees || 5 – 0 || Wang (16-6) || Schilling (8-6) || || 55,067 || 80-54
|- style="background-color:#ffbbbb"
| 135 || August 31 || Orioles || 9 – 8 || Birkins (1-1) || Tavárez (7-10) || Báez (3) || 36,810 || 80-55

|- style="background-color:#bbffbb"
| 136 || September 1 || Orioles || 10 – 0 || Buchholz (2-0) || Olson (1-3) || || 36,819 || 81-55
|- style="background-color:#bbffbb"
| 137 || September 2 || Orioles || 3 – 2 || Lester (3-0) || Cabrera (9-14) || Papelbon (31) || 36,340 || 82-55
|- style="background-color:#bbffbb"
| 138 || September 3 || Blue Jays || 13 – 10 || Matsuzaka (14-11) || Litsch (5-7) || Papelbon (32) || 36,639 || 83-55
|- style="background-color:#bbffbb"
| 139 || September 4 || Blue Jays || 5 – 3 || Beckett (17-6) || Halladay (14-7)|| Papelbon (33) || 36,839 || 84-55
|- style="background-color:#ffbbbb"
| 140 || September 5 || Blue Jays || 6 – 4 || Accardo (4-3) || Okajima (3-2) || || 37,106 || 84-56
|- style="background-color:#bbffbb"
| 141 || September 6 || @ Orioles || 7 – 6 || Buchholz (3-0) || Báez (0-6) || Papelbon (34) || 27,472 || 85-56
|- style="background-color:#bbffbb"
| 142 || September 7 || @ Orioles || 4 – 0 || Lester (4-0) || Cabrera (9-15) || || 34,091 || 86-56
|- style="background-color:#ffbbbb"
| 143 || September 8 || @ Orioles || 11 – 5 || Leicester (1-1) || Matsuzaka (14-12) || || 48,043 || 86-57
|- style="background-color:#bbffbb"
| 144 || September 9 || @ Orioles || 3 – 2 || Beckett (18-6) || Bradford (3-7) || Papelbon (35) || 39,234 || 87-57
|- style="background-color:#ffbbbb"
| 145 || September 10 || Devil Rays || 1 – 0 || Kazmir (12-8)  || Schilling (8-7) || Reyes (24) || 36,907 || 87-58
|- style="background-color:#bbffbb"
| 146 || September 11 || Devil Rays || 16 – 10 || Corey (1-0) || Switzer (0-1) || || 36,640 || 88-58
|- style="background-color:#bbffbb"
| 147 || September 12 || Devil Rays || 5 – 4 || Papelbon (1-2) || Reyes (2-3) || || 36,931 || 89-58
|- style="background-color:#ffbbbb"
| 148 || September 14 || Yankees || 8 – 7 || Bruney (3-1) || Papelbon (1-3) || Rivera (27) || 36,590 || 89-59
|- style="background-color:#bbffbb"
| 149 || September 15 || Yankees || 10 – 1 || Beckett (19-6) || Wang (18-7) || || 36,215 || 90-59
|- style="background-color:#ffbbbb"
| 150 || September 16 || Yankees || 4 – 3 || Chamberlain (2-0) || Schilling (8-8) || Rivera (28) || 36,533 || 90-60
|- style="background-color:#ffbbbb"
| 151 || September 17 || @ Blue Jays || 6 – 1 || McGowan (11-9) || Wakefield (16-11) || || 29,316 || 90-61
|- style="background-color:#ffbbbb"
| 152 || September 18 || @ Blue Jays || 4 – 3 || Burnett (9-7) || Gagné (3-2) || Downs (1) || 32,290 || 90-62
|- style="background-color:#ffbbbb"
| 153 || September 19 || @ Blue Jays || 6 – 1 || Litsch (6-9) || Buchholz (3-1) || Accardo (28) || 34,927 || 90-63
|- style="background-color:#bbffbb"
| 154 || September 21 || @ Devil Rays || 8 – 1 || Beckett (20-6) || Kazmir (13-9) || || 27,369 || 91-63
|- style="background-color:#bbffbb"
| 155 || September 22 || @ Devil Rays || 8 – 6 || Gagné (4-2) || Reyes (2-4) || Papelbon (36) || 34,626 || 92-63
|- style="background-color:#ffbbbb"
| 156 || September 23 || @ Devil Rays || 5 – 4 || Jackson (5-15) || Wakefield (16-12) || Reyes (25) || 30,310 || 92-64
|- style="background-color:#bbffbb"
| 157 || September 25 || Athletics || 7 – 3 || Schilling (9-8) || Gaudin (11-13) || || 36,708 || 93-64
|- style="background-color:#bbffbb"
| 158 || September 26 || Athletics || 11 – 6 || Timlin (2-1) || Blevins (0-1) || || 36,570 || 94-64
|- style="background-color:#ffbbbb"
| 159 || September 27 || Twins || 5 – 4 || Bonser (8-12) || Beckett (20-7) || Nathan (36) || 36,743 || 94-65
|- style="background-color:#bbffbb"
| 160 || September 28 || Twins || 5 – 2 || Matsuzaka (15-12) || Slowey (4-1) || Papelbon (37) || 36,843 || 95-65
|- style="background-color:#bbffbb"
| 161 || September 29 || Twins || (4 - 6)|| Wakefield (17-12) || Blackburn (0-2) || Okajima (5) || 36,619 || 96-65
|- style="background-color:#ffbbbb"
| 162 || September 30 || Twins || 3 – 2 || Garza (5-7) || Tavárez (7-11) || Nathan (37) || 36,364 || 96-66

Postseason

ALDS vs. Los Angeles Angels of Anaheim
 Boston wins series 3–0

ALCS vs. Cleveland Indians
 Boston wins series 4–3

World Series vs. Colorado Rockies
 Boston wins series 4–0

 The Red Sox set an MLB post-season record by outscoring their collective opponents 99–46.

Roster

Player stats

Batting

Starters by position
Note: Pos = Position; G = Games played; AB = At bats; H = Hits; Avg. = Batting average; HR = Home runs; RBI = Runs batted in

Other batters
Note: G = Games played; AB = At bat; H = Hits; Avg. = Batting average; HR = Home runs; RBI = Runs batted in

Pitching

Starting pitchers 
Note: GS = Games started; IP = Innings pitched; W = Wins; L = Losses; ERA = Earned run average; SO = Strikeouts

Spot-starting pitchers 
Note: GS = Games started; IP = Innings pitched; W = Wins; L = Losses; ERA = Earned run average; SO = Strikeouts

*Statistics listed are only for games started.

Relief pitchers 
Note: G = Games pitched; W = Wins; L = Losses; SV = Saves; ERA = Earned run average; SO = Strikeouts

Post-season

|- bgcolor="bbffbb" 
| 1 || October 3 || Angels || 4–0 || Beckett (1–0) || Lackey (0–1) ||  || 37,597 || 1–0
|- bgcolor="bbffbb"
| 2 || October 5 || Angels || 6–3 || Papelbon (1–0) || Speier (0–1) ||   || 37,706 || 2–0
|- bgcolor="bbffbb"
| 3 || October 7 || @Angels || 9–1 || Schilling (1–0) || Weaver (0–1) ||  || 45,262 || 3–0
|-

|- bgcolor="bbffbb" 
| 1 || October 12 || Indians || 10–3 || Beckett (2–0) || Sabathia (1–1) || || 36,986 || 1–0 (4–0)
|- bgcolor="ffbbbb"
| 2 || October 13 || Indians || 13 – 6  || Mastny (1–0) || Gagne (0–1) ||  || 37,051 || 1–1 (4–1)
|- bgcolor="ffbbbb"
| 3 || October 15 || @ Indians || 4–2 || Westbrook (1–1) || Matsuzaka (1–1) || Borowski (2) || 44,402 || 1–2 (4–2)
|- bgcolor="ffbbbb"
| 4 || October 16 || @ Indians || 7–3 || Byrd (1–0) || Wakefield (0–1) ||  || 44,008 || 1–3 (4–3)
|- bgcolor="bbffbb"
| 5 || October 18 || @ Indians || 7–1 || Beckett (3–0) || Sabathia (1–2) ||  || 44,588 || 2–3 (5–3)
|- bgcolor="bbffbb"
| 6 || October 20 || Indians || 12–2 || Schilling (2–0) || Carmona (0–1) ||  || 37,163 || 3–3 (6–3)
|- bgcolor="bbffbb"
| 7 || October 21 || Indians || 11–2 || Matsuzaka (2–1) || Westbrook (1–2) || Papelbon (1) || 37,165 || 4–3 (7–3)
|-

|- bgcolor="bbffbb" 
| 1 || October 24 || Rockies || 13–1 || Beckett (1–0) || Francis (0–1) || || 36,733 || 1–0 (8–3)
|- bgcolor="bbffbb" 
| 2 || October 25 || Rockies || 2–1 || Schilling (1–0) || Jiménez (0–1) || Papelbon (1) || 36,730 || 2–0 (9–3)
|- bgcolor="bbffbb" 
| 3 || October 27 || @ Rockies || 10–5  || Matsuzaka (1–0)  || Fogg (0–1) || Papelbon (2) || 49,983 || 3–0 (10–3)
|- bgcolor="bbffbb" 
| 4 || October 28 || @ Rockies || 4–3 || Lester (1–0)  || Cook (0–1) || Papelbon (3) || 50,041 || 4–0 (11–3)

Division Series 

The Red Sox not only won the AL East Division for the first time in 12 years, but clinched the best record in the American League—and all of baseball.  While their 96–66 record was the same as that of the Cleveland Indians, the Red Sox held the season series tiebreaker for American League home-field advantage, having bested the Tribe 5 games to 2.  Thus, the wild card New York Yankees were sent to Cleveland while the Sox would host the Los Angeles Angels of Anaheim.

Josh Beckett started the series with a complete-game shutout in Game 1, resuming his dominance of the postseason after a three-season absence.  Although Kevin Youkilis hit a solo home run in the first inning that would prove to be all the offense Beckett needed, David Ortiz provided additional support with a two-run homer in the third to cap off a 4–0 Game 1 victory.  Game 2 was much closer, with Daisuke Matsuzaka and Kelvim Escobar each surrendering three runs by the time the fifth inning was done.  In the bottom of the ninth, after a Julio Lugo single and David Ortiz's playoff record-tying fourth walk of the night (this time, intentional), Manny Ramírez ended the game with a towering home run that left Fenway Park over the Green Monster.  With a 6–3 Game 2 win, the Red Sox would go to Angel Stadium of Anaheim with a 2–0 series lead.

In Game 3, Curt Schilling brought back the dominant pitching, scattering six hits and striking out four in seven innings of shutout work.  He had plenty of run support as well, with Ortiz and Ramírez hitting back-to-back solo home runs in the fourth, and a progression of hits that scored seven more in the eighth inning. Éric Gagné gave up the only run, giving up a ground-rule double to Maicer Izturis in the bottom of the ninth, then advancing Izturis to third on a wild pitch before giving up a sacrifice fly to Howie Kendrick that scored Izturis.  After that, a strikeout and a flyout ended the game with a 9–1 Red Sox victory to clinch a series sweep.

The Red Sox sweep was one of three Division Series sweeps in the 2007 post-season.  Only one series would go more than three—the Indians beat the Yankees in four games.

League Championship Series 

In Game 1, Travis Hafner got the first run on Josh Beckett with a solo home run in the first inning.  Manny Ramírez answered back, driving in Kevin Youkilis with a single in the bottom of the first.  After that, Beckett settled in, while Indians starter C.C. Sabathia fell apart.  In the bottom of the third, he gave up a ground-rule double to Julio Lugo, and then after a bunt groundout for Dustin Pedroia, he walked Kevin Youkilis, hit David Ortiz, and walked Manny Ramírez to give up the lead.  Then he gave up a double to Mike Lowell that scored Youkilis and Ortiz.  After Bobby Kielty was walked, Jason Varitek hit a groundout that could not be turned into a double-play, scoring Ramírez.  The Sox tacked five more on, and win Game 1, 10–3.

Game 2 was a slugfest, with Curt Schilling and Fausto Carmona both failing to make it out of the fifth inning, and a 6–6 tie after six innings.  The game drew into extra frames, but the Red Sox bullpen got hammered in the top of the eleventh, with Éric Gagné, Javier López and Jon Lester giving up seven runs.  The Red Sox failed to answer back, and lost Game 2, 13–6.  The series was even headed to Cleveland.

In Game 3, Daisuke Matsuzaka gave up 4 runs, and Jason Varitek provided the only Red Sox offense with a two-run homer in the seventh, as the Indians took the Jacobs Field opener, 4–2, for a 2–1 series lead.  Game 4 did not start much better for the Red Sox, with a seven-run fifth inning that saw Manny Delcarmen allow four runs (two charged to starter Tim Wakefield).  In the top of the sixth, the Sox showed some life with back-to-back-to-back solo home runs by Kevin Youkilis, David Ortiz and Manny Ramírez.  That would be all of the Sox offense, as they fell, 7–3, to end up in a 3–1 ALCS hole once again.

Once more, the Red Sox faced ALCS elimination.  But one person who was not panicking was Manny Ramírez.  In his typical "Manny Being Manny" attitude, Ramirez told reporters that if the Red Sox were eliminated, it wouldn't be "the end of the world."  His comments seemed laissez faire at the time, as many members of the Boston media chose to interpret them as meaning that Manny would not put forth his best effort in the games to come and would thus disrupt his team's ability to compete. Fate proved them wrong though. With Josh Beckett on the mound again for Game 5, the Red Sox dominated, with Kevin Youkilis driving in three and David Ortiz driving in two to power a 7–1 Red Sox victory to force the ALCS back to Fenway Park.

The Red Sox were hardly finished.  In Game 6, Curt Schilling redeemed himself, giving up two runs in seven innings, while J. D. Drew hammered a grand slam in the first inning, and the Sox tacked on six more in the third, leading to a 12–2 victory.  Éric Gagné finished the game by pitching a perfect 9th inning.  Game 7 gave Daisuke Matsuzaka his chance at redemption, and he did not disappoint, giving up 2 runs in five innings, while Hideki Okajima and Jonathan Papelbon each pitched two scoreless innings.  The Sox hammered out a run in each of the first three innings, then exploded with a Dustin Pedroia two-run homer in the seventh, and six more runs—including another two-run homer by Kevin Youkilis—in the eighth.  With an 11–2 Game 7 victory, the Red Sox came back once again from elimination, bringing them to their second World Series in four years.

2007 World Series 

At first, the World Series seemed like a tough task.  After going the distance with the Indians, the Red Sox had to face the red-hot Colorado Rockies, who had just finished a 21-of-22 run that included forcing and winning a Wild Card one-game playoff with the San Diego Padres, then sweeping the Philadelphia Phillies in the NLDS and the Arizona Diamondbacks in the NLCS.  The Red Sox were counting on their historically-dominant postseason pitching and the possibility that eight days off would leave the Rox rusty.

Game 1 proved, once more, to be a domination.  Josh Beckett gave up just one run in seven innings of work while striking out nine, while Rockies starter Jeff Francis gave up a home run on his second pitch to Dustin Pedroia in the bottom of the first, and a total of six runs in four innings.  It got worse from there, as the Red Sox hammered reliever Franklin Morales for seven runs in the fifth inning.  The Red Sox took Game 1, 13–1.

In Game 2, Curt Schilling gave up one run in 5 innings, and Hideki Okajima and Jonathan Papelbon finished the game flawlessly.  This time, the dominance was necessary, as the Red Sox scored two times, with Jason Varitek driving in Mike Lowell in the fourth, then Lowell driving in David Ortiz in the fifth for their only offense of the game.  With a 2–1 Game 2 win, the Red Sox went to Coors Field in Denver with the advantage, hoping the rarefied air would not affect them too much.

Game 3 began with another dominating offensive performance.  Boston struck first, with six runs in the third inning that knocked out Rox starter Josh Fogg.  Mike Lowell and pitcher Daisuke Matsuzaka each had two RBIs, and Manny Ramírez was called out at home on a controversial, but ultimately correct, tagout call.  The Rockies tried to come back, bringing in five runs, including a Matt Holliday home run.  But the Sox put it away, with rookies Dustin Pedroia and Jacoby Ellsbury combining to drive in three in the eighth inning, and Mike Lowell scoring the final Sox run in the ninth to seal a 10–5 win that put the Red Sox one game away from their second World Series Championship in four years.

Game 4 gave Jon Lester his shot at redemption, as a back injury to Tim Wakefield gave Lester the start.  He was scoreless in  innings, with Mike Lowell scoring two runs and Jacoby Ellsbury scoring one in support.  In the eighth inning, Bobby Kielty hit a pinch-hit home run to put an end to the Sox's scoring.  Hideki Okajima almost gave the game up, allowing two runs in the eighth before Jonathan Papelbon came in to save the game in  innings.  The Red Sox celebrated a 4–3 win and a four-game World Series sweep at Coors Field.  Mike Lowell, with his .400 average and six runs scored, was named the MVP of the World Series.

Two days later, on October 30, the Red Sox were the guests of honor in a Rolling Rally through Boston, after which the team began to lay their plans for the 2008 season.

Red Sox rookies
During the course of the 2007 season, the Red Sox were helped out and sometimes carried by rookies. Five rookies stick out in particular. Dustin Pedroia, Jacoby Ellsbury, Clay Buchholz, Daisuke Matsuzaka, and Hideki Okajima all had their moments and left their mark of this season in Red Sox history.

Dustin Pedroia began the season as the Red Sox starting second baseman. Pedroia, 24, struggled in April only batting .182, with 10 hits in 55 at-bats. Although he struggled in the first month, Pedroia heated up batting an outstanding .415 in the month of May. Pedroia was honored as American League Rookie of the Month for the month of May. Pedroia continued this hot hitting for the remainder of the season. Pedroia also excelled his play in the postseason by 2 HR and driving in 10 runs in 14 games to help the Red Sox win the World Series. Pedroia ended batting .317 which ranked 10th among all American League players. Pedroia also finished with 8 home runs and 50 runs batted in. Pedroia won the American League Rookie of the Year award.

Pedroia was not the only rookie position player to make an impact this season. Jacoby Ellsbury, 24, made his MLB debut on June 30. Instantly Ellsbury succeeded. In only 33 games and 116 at-bats, Ellsbury hit .353, had 3 home runs, and had 41 hits. Jacoby also showed off his versatility by stealing 9 bases without getting caught. Ellsbury also had a terrific postseason. Ellsbury replaced center fielder Coco Crisp in Game 6 of the ALCS against the Indians. He did not heat up until Game 3 of the World Series, where he had 4 hits and 2 doubles. Ellsbury batted an amazing .438 in the 4-game sweep of the Colorado Rockies.

The Boston Red Sox also had one incredible rookie pitcher named Clay Buchholz. Buchholz, 23, made his MLB debut on August 17. In his first start against the Los Angeles Angels of Anaheim at Fenway Park, Buchholz pitched 6 innings, allowing 3 earned runs, while striking out 5 batters. However, it was not until his second Major League start before Clay Buchholz became a household name throughout Red Sox Nation. On September 1 against the Baltimore Orioles at Fenway Park, Buchholz pitched a no-hitter. He struck out 9 Orioles including Oriole right fielder Nick Markakis on a curveball to complete this outstanding feat. Buchholz became the second rookie in Major League history to pitch a no-hitter. Buchholz pitched in 4 games with the Red Sox. He was 3–1 with a 1.59 ERA and 22 strikeouts. Despite his success in the regular season, Buchholz was left off the Red Sox postseason roster due to what Red Sox management determined was a fatigued arm.

Season milestones

The season got off to a wonderful start. On April 22, 2007, in a game against the New York Yankees, the Red Sox hit four consecutive home runs for the first time in franchise history (and the fifth time in major league history), when Manny Ramírez, J. D. Drew, Mike Lowell, and Jason Varitek all hit home runs off Yankees pitcher Chase Wright.  Drew also hit the second of four consecutive home runs the last time this happened, when the Los Angeles Dodgers did it against the San Diego Padres on September 18, 2006. That series was also the first series since the 1990 season that the Red Sox swept the Yankees in a three-game series at Fenway.

Six members of the Red Sox were chosen to play in the season's all-star game. David Ortiz was elected to start at first base by the fans, third baseman Mike Lowell and outfielder Manny Ramírez were chosen by their fellow players as reserves.  Pitchers Josh Beckett and Jonathan Papelbon made the initial team, and reliever Hideki Okajima was voted in by the fans as the winner of the 32nd-man internet vote.  It was the first time the Red Sox had more than two pitchers make the all-star team. Josh Beckett was credited with the win for the American League.

On September 1, 2007, against the Baltimore Orioles, rookie pitcher Clay Buchholz threw a no hitter in his second major league start. He was the first rookie in Red Sox history to throw a no hitter, as well as the 17th pitcher in Red Sox history to throw one. He got nine strikeouts and gave up three walks and hit one batter.

Julio Lugo and Coco Crisp became the first pair of Red Sox players to have at least 25 stolen bases since Tris Speaker and Hal Janvrin in 1914.

Leading the league with a perfect 1.000 fielding percentage, and an AL-record 1,079 errorless chances at first, Kevin Youkilis won the 2007 AL Gold Glove award for first basemen.

Awards and honors 
 Jacoby Ellsbury – AL Rookie of the Month (September)
 Hideki Okajima – AL Rookie of the Month (April)
 David Ortiz – Silver Slugger Award (DH), AL Player of the Month (September)
 Dustin Pedroia – American League Rookie of the Year, AL Rookie of the Month (May)
 Kevin Youkilis – Gold Glove Award (1B)

All-Star Game
 Josh Beckett, reserve P
 Mike Lowell, reserve 3B
 Hideki Okajima, reserve P (final vote winner)
 David Ortiz, starting 1B
 Jonathan Papelbon, reserve P
 Manny Ramírez, reserve OF

Farm system

The Class A-Advanced affiliate changed from the Wilmington Blue Rocks to the Lancaster JetHawks.

Source:

References

Further reading

External links

Game logs:
1st half: Boston Red Sox Game Log on ESPN.com
2nd half: Boston Red Sox Game Log on ESPN.com
2007 Boston Red Sox at Baseball Reference
Batting statistics: Boston Red Sox stats on ESPN.com
Pitching statistics: Boston Red Sox pitching stats on ESPN.com
2007 Boston Red Sox Draft Selections 

World Series champion seasons
Boston Red Sox seasons
American League East champion seasons
American League champion seasons
Boston Red Sox
Boston Red Sox
Red Sox